Amritha Meera Vijayan is a South Indian actress in the Malayalam film industry. She is known for her roles in Action Hero Biju (film).

Personal life 

Amritha Meera Vijayan was born into a Nair Family in Kozhikode (Calicut) as the elder daughter of K.Vijayan and P.G. Meera. She has a younger brother Anoop Meera Vijayan, who is a thyring lieutenant service for the Indian Air Force.She is raised completely in Bangalore. Completed her schooling in St. Thomas Public School Bangalore and Higher Secondary in Jyoti Nivas College, Bangalore. She completed her BSC and MSC in electronics from Mount Carmel College, Bangalore. And worked as Software engineer in Cognizant Technological Solutions.

Filmography

References

External links 
 
 

Living people
Actresses in Malayalam cinema
Indian film actresses
Actresses from Kozhikode
Actresses in Malayalam television
Indian television actresses
21st-century Indian actresses
Year of birth missing (living people)
Mount Carmel College, Bangalore alumni